Joan Cheng Sim Pereira (born 1967) is a Singaporean politician and businesswoman. A member of the governing People's Action Party (PAP), she has been the Member of Parliament (MP) representing the Henderson–Dawson division of Tanjong Pagar GRC since 2015.

Education
Pereira was educated at the Convent of the Holy infant Jesus and Catholic Junior College before graduating from the National University of Singapore with a Bachelor of Arts degree.

Career
Pereira is the assistant general manager at Temasek Cares, the philanthropic arm of state sovereign fund Temasek Holdings. She was previously the director of Family Life and Active Ageing at the People's Association.

Political career
In 2015, the People's Action Party (PAP) announced that Pereira would contest in the Tanjong Pagar Group Representation Constituency during the 2015 general election. She now serves as member of parliament for Tanjong Pagar GRC. She was then appointed Deputy Chairperson of Social and Family Development Government Parliamentary Committee (GPC) in the 14th Parliament of Singapore.

References

External links
 Joan Pereira on Parliament of Singapore

Living people
Members of the Parliament of Singapore
People's Action Party politicians
Singaporean people of Portuguese descent
Singaporean people of Cantonese descent
Singaporean women in politics
1967 births